The following are the squads of the 12 teams that will participate at the 2016 FIBA Asia Challenge.

Group A

China

Jordan

Kazakhstan

Group B

Philippines

India

Chinese Taipei

Group C

Iran

Qatar

Iraq

Group D

Japan

}

South Korea

Thailand

References

Squads
Basketball squads